Escúzar is a municipality located in the province of Granada, Spain. According to the 2005 census (INE), the city has a population of 785 inhabitants.

References

External links
Escúzar  - Excmo. Ayuntamiento de Escúzar

Municipalities in the Province of Granada